Carinthia is a state of Austria.

Carinthia may also refer to:

March of Carinthia, a frontier district of the Carolingian Empire created in 889
Duchy of Carinthia, a state of the Holy Roman Empire and Austrian crown land
Carinthia (Slovenia), a traditional region of Slovenia, part of the former duchy
Carinthia Statistical Region, a statistical region in Slovenia
RMS Carinthia (1925), a passenger ship 
RMS Carinthia (1955), a passenger ship

See also
Koroška (disambiguation)
Carantania, a medieval Slavic principality
Carniola
Carnia
Corinthia